WOLG is an FM radio station at 95.9 MHz in Carlinville, Illinois, owned and operated by the Covenant Network of Catholic radio stations.

History
WCNL went on the air December 8, 1990. Owned by the Carlinville Broadcasting Company, a subsidiary of Miller Media Group, the station aired a country format.

Covenant Network acquired WCNL and WTIM in Taylorville in 1998, with the FM station going for $300,000. WOLG and WIHM, the former WTIM, began simulcasting programming. WOLG was the first FM radio station owned by Covenant Network.

Translators
WOLG is the nominal source of Covenant programming to nine translators, the most of any full-power station in the network.

References

External links

OLG
Catholic radio stations
Radio stations established in 1990
1990 establishments in Illinois